Irreecha (also called  or ), is thanksgiving holiday celebrating the end of the winter in Oromia Region, Ethiopia. The Oromo people celebrate Irreecha to thank Waaqa (God) for the blessings and mercies they have received throughout the previous year. The Irreecha festival is celebrated every year at the beginning of Birraa (Spring), new season after the dark and rainy winter season. It is attended by hundreds of thousands people. The thanksgiving is celebrated at sacred lakes across Oromia and Hora Harsadi, Bishoftu, Oromia as a whole. Once at the lake, festival-goers immerse freshly cut  green grass and the flowers they are carrying and sprinkle themselves and place in water.

In 2019, the festival was celebrated in Addis Ababa, the capital city of Ethiopia, for the first time in 150 years, followed by Irreecha in Bishoftu. The 2020 Irreecha in Addis Ababa was celebrated by around 5,000 people due to political tension and the COVID-19 pandemic. Irreecha is also celebrated around the world where diaspora Oromos live especially in North America and Europe.

Observance

Many people interpreted the Irrecha festival of the Oromo people as a festival of difficulty period between the month of June and September. But the reality is not as many as exaggerated today. But the Irrecha festival of the festival of welcoming the expected seeds and friutes of prosperity, and peace. The Oromo people also consider the winter rainy season of June to September is a time of difficulty for communications, with families, friends due to heavy rain which could cause swelling rivers and floods that may drown people, cattle, crop, and flood homes. Also, family relationships will suffer during winter rain as they can't visit each other because of swelling rivers. In addition, winter time could be a time of hunger for some because the previous harvest collected in January is running short and the new harvest is not ripe yet. Because of this, some families may endure food shortages during the winter. In Birraa (Spring in Oromoland), this shortage ends as many food crops especially maize is ripe and families can eat their fill. Other crops like potato, barley, etc. will also be ripe in Birraa. Some disease types like malaria also break out during rainy winter time. Because of this, the Oromos see winter as a difficult season. It does not mean the Oromo people hate rain or the winter season at all. Even when there is a shortage of rain, they pray to Waaqa (God) for rain.

The Oromo people celebrate Irreecha not only to thank Waaqa (God) but also to welcome the new season of plentiful harvests after the dark and rainy winter season associated with nature and creatures. At Irreecha festivals, friends, family, and relatives gather together and celebrate with joy and happiness. Irreecha festivals bring people closer to each other and make social bonds.

Moreover, the Oromo people celebrate this auspicious event to mark the end of the rainy season, known as Ganna, which was established by Oromo forefathers, in the time of Gadaa Melbaa in Mormor, Oromia. The auspicious day on which this last Mormor Day of Gadaa Melbaa - the Dark Time of starvation and hunger- was established on the Sunday of last week of September or the Sunday of the 1st week of October according to the Gadaa lunar calendar has been designated as National Thanksgiving Day by modern-day Oromo people.

Stampede
On 2 October 2016, between 55 and 300 festival goers were killed in a stampede at the Irreecha cultural thanksgiving festival, which was the largest and most sacred cultural festival for the Oromo people. In just one day, dozens were killed and many more were injured during the stampede. Locals blamed security forces for triggering the stampede.

References

Harvest festivals
October observances
November observances
Secular holidays
Food and drink appreciation
Ethiopian culture
Oromo people
September observances